Margherita Guzzinati (18 May 1940 – 31 October 1997) was an Italian stage, television and film actress and television presenter.

Life and career 
Specialized in the Goldonian repertoire, she often worked alongside Cesco Baseggio.

Rarely active in films, Guzzinati was well known for her television works, as a presenter of some RAI cultural programs and for her appearances in several major TV-series.

References

External links 

 

1940 births
1997 deaths
Italian film actresses
Italian stage actresses
Italian television actresses
Italian television presenters
20th-century Italian actresses
Mass media people from Rome
Italian women television presenters